The 1975–76 season was the 77th completed season of The Football League.

Liverpool won their first major trophy under Bob Paisley by narrowly winning the league title after heated competition from Queens Park Rangers. They also lifted the UEFA Cup for the second time in their history. Dave Sexton's QPR side failed to win their first-ever league title but still managed to finish in their highest ever position of runners-up and qualify for the UEFA Cup. Following QPR into Europe were Tommy Docherty's promising young Manchester United side, Dave Mackay's defending champions Derby County and Jimmy Armfield's Leeds United.

Going down were Wolverhampton Wanderers, Burnley and Sheffield United.

Bertie Mee, 57, retired after ten years as manager of Arsenal. The highlights of his career had been the Inter-Cities Fairs Cup triumph of 1970 and the Double win 1971, but Arsenal had fallen behind the best in recent seasons and Mee handed over the reins to Terry Neill.

Three years after winning the FA Cup, Bob Stokoe's Sunderland finally won promotion to the top flight as Second Division champions. Bristol City and West Bromwich Albion occupied the two other promotion places. Oxford United, York City and Portsmouth went down to the Third Division.

The division's biggest headline hitters were Southampton, who finished sixth in the league but surprised the footballing world by overcoming Manchester United to win the FA Cup.

Hereford United won the Third Division title to reach the Second Division just four years after joining the league. Also going up to the Second Division were Cardiff City and Millwall. Aldershot, Colchester United, Southend United and Halifax Town were relegated to the Fourth Division. Narrowly avoiding the drop were Sheffield Wednesday, who a decade before were one of the most feared sides in England and during the interwar years had won the league championship and the FA Cup.

The 32-year-old Graham Taylor achieved the first success of his managerial career by winning the Fourth Division title with Lincoln City. He was linked with several job vacancies in the First and Second Divisions but surprised everyone by taking over at Elton John's Watford, who were still in the Fourth Division. It was to be the start of a long and successful association with the Hornets for Taylor. Joining Lincoln in the Third Division were Northampton Town, Reading and Tranmere Rovers. 1975–76 had finally brought something positive after a decade of trauma for Northampton Town, which had seen them slump from the First Division to the Fourth Division.

This year, the Football League voted in favour of the bottom four clubs in the Fourth Division and there were no departures or arrivals in the league for 1976–77.

Final league tables and results

The tables and results below are reproduced here in the exact form that they can be found at The Rec.Sport.Soccer Statistics Foundation website and in Rothmans Book of Football League Records 1888–89 to 1978–79, with home and away statistics separated.

Beginning with the season 1894–95, clubs finishing level on points were separated according to goal average (goals scored divided by goals conceded), or more properly put, goal ratio. In case one or more teams had the same goal difference, this system favoured those teams who had scored fewer goals. The 1975-76 season was the last season that the goal average system was used.

Since the Fourth Division was established in the 1958–59 season, the bottom four teams of that division have been required to apply for re-election.

First Division

Liverpool won their first silverware under Bob Paisley by lifting their second UEFA Cup, and winning the league title. They won eight of their last nine matches and finished one point ahead of QPR, who achieved the highest finish of their history. Manchester United's revival under Tommy Docherty continued as they finished third in the league and reached their first cup final of the 1970s, where they took on Second Division underdogs Southampton in the FA Cup Final but surprisingly lost 1-0. Defending champions Derby County surrendered their title crown but managed a decent fourth-place finish in the league. Leeds United completed the top five but were denied a place in the UEFA Cup as they were still banned from Europe following the antics of their fans at the 1975 European Cup Final. Manchester City triumphed over Newcastle United in the final of the League Cup to win their first major trophy for six years.

FA Cup holders West Ham United finished 18th in the league but did enjoy a good run in Europe, finishing runners-up in the European Cup Winners' Cup. Arsenal endured another disappointing season as they finished 17th.

Sheffield United, who had finished sixth a year earlier, went down in bottom place after winning just six league games all season. They were joined by Burnley and Wolves.

Results

Maps

Second Division

Three years after making history as the first postwar FA Cup winners from outside the top flight, Sunderland finally made their way back to the First Division after six years away by winning the Second Division title. Runners-up Bristol City achieved promotion after 65 years away from the First Division, finishing level on points with West Bromwich Albion.

Bolton Wanderers missed out on promotion by a single point, while Southampton compensated for a failed promotion bid by winning the FA Cup at the expense of Manchester United - the first major trophy of their history.

Nottingham Forest progressed to eighth place in their first full season under the management of Brian Clough, while Chelsea's first season at this level for more than a decade produced a disappointing 11th-place finish, with financial problems still blighting the club.

Portsmouth, York City and Oxford United went down to the Third Division.

Results

Maps

Third Division

Results

Maps

Fourth Division

Results

Maps

See also
 1975-76 in English football

References

Ian Laschke: Rothmans Book of Football League Records 1888–89 to 1978–79. Macdonald and Jane's, London & Sydney, 1980.

 
English Football League seasons
1975–76 in English football leagues